Shapur (Persian: شاپور یکم) was the seventh ruler of the Bavand dynasty, who ruled briefly in 825. He was the son and successor of Shahriyar I.

Reign 
Just when Shapur had ascended the Bavandid throne, the Qarinvand Mazyar, whom Shapur's father Shahriyar I along with Mazyar's uncle Vinda-Umid had expelled from Tabaristan, returned with an Abbasid army, and invaded the territories of Shapur and Vinda-Umid, where he defeated them both. Vinda-Umid was killed, whilst Shapur was taken hostage.

Shapur, knowing that Mazyar planned to have him killed, sent a secret message to the Abbasid governor of Tabaristan, Musa ibn Hafs, willing to pay him 100,000 dirhams if he would assert him as his own prisoner. Musa responded by saying his best shot would be by converting to Islam and become a client of the caliph. Musa, nervous of Mazyar learning of his secret communication with Shapur, asked him how he would react if Shapur converted to Islam and offered to become a client of the caliph. Mazyar gave no answer, but had Shapur beheaded the same day, which greatly angered Musa.

References

Sources
 
 

Bavand dynasty
9th-century monarchs in Asia
9th-century Iranian people
825 deaths
Year of birth unknown
Zoroastrian rulers